Paul Rudd (born 1969) is an American actor known for comedies

Paul Rudd may also refer to:

Paul Ryan Rudd (1940–2010), American actor known for theater work
Paul Rudd (DJ) (born 1979), English house music DJ

See also
Paul Rugg (born 1960), American screenwriter, producer, voice actor, and puppeteer.
Paul Rugg (cricketer) (born 1978), New Zealander cricketer